Josep Llunas i Pujals  (January 30, 1852–May 23, 1905) was a Catalan libertarian and free-thinker from Spain.

He was a typesetter by profession, but he also studied music and singing and was a theatrical director. Of special significance in this regard was his role as secretary of the Catalan Athenaeum of the Working Classes, a proletarian cultural center which promoted a type of scientific anarchism. Llunas believed that the growth of science would promote social equality.

Major works
 Estudios filosófico-sociales (1882)
 La revolució: poema en tres cants (1886)
 El Ariete Socialista Internacional (1887)
 Qüestions socials (1891)
 Los partits socialistes espanyols (1892)
 La Ley y la clase obrera (1893)

See also
 Mutualism
 Anarcho-Collectivism

References

Bibliography
 J. Santasusagna. Reus i els reusencs en el Renaixement de Catalunya. Reus, 1982.
 Autores varios. Enciclopèdia Catalana. Barcelona, edicions 62, 1997.
 Autores varios. Història de la cultura catalana. Barcelona, edicions 62.
 Iñiguez Miguel. Esbozo de una enciclopedia histórica del anarquismo. Madrid, Fundación Anselmo Lorenzo, 2001.

External links
 International Institute of Social History: Barcelona 1893-1897

1852 births
1905 deaths
Collectivist anarchists
Libertarian socialists
People from Barcelona
Spanish anarchists
Typesetters
Print journalists
Spanish journalists
Anarchist writers